Jamaica participated at the 2018 Summer Youth Olympics in Buenos Aires, Argentina from 6 October to 18 October 2018.

Medalists

Athletics

Swimming

References

2018 in Jamaican sport
Nations at the 2018 Summer Youth Olympics
Jamaica at the Youth Olympics